Enwan is an Edoid language of Edo State, Nigeria.

References

Edoid languages
Languages of Nigeria